Scott Ruderham (born 1988) is an international lawn bowler from Jersey.

Bowls career
Ruderham became a British champion in 2016 after winning the fours at the British Isles Bowls Championships.

In 2015 he won the fours gold medal at the Atlantic Bowls Championships and fours years later won a silver medal in the same event at the Championships. He represented Jersey in the 2016 World Outdoor Bowls Championship in Christchurch, New Zealand, in the pairs and fours.

In 2021 Ruderham won his first Sun Bowls Club Singles Championship. In October 2021, Ruderham was selected to represent Jersey in the 2022 Commonwealth Games being held in Birmingham. He duly competed in the men's triples and the men's fours at the Games.

References

Jersey bowls players
Living people
1988 births
Bowls players at the 2022 Commonwealth Games